Mehrzad Marashi (born 20 September 1980) is a German singer of Iranian descent and the winner of Deutschland sucht den Superstar season 7.

Early life
Born in Tehran, Iran where his father was in the military profession during the Shah's regime, the family immigrated to Germany for political reasons when Mehrzad was just six, residing in Hamburg. At 13 he joined a gospel choir and eventually took classes at the Sängerakademie, studying voice and piano. Taking the stage name "Marasco", he released self-produced recordings finding some limited success. He recorded "She's Gone", a cover of "She's Like the Wind" from Patrick Swayze. He opened a karaoke bar, but the business went bankrupt and he had to live on welfare for a while.

Deutschland sucht den Superstar
Marashi auditioned to the seventh season of the show Deutschland sucht den Superstar initially under his stage name "Marasco". Very notably during a live show on DSDS on 10 April 2010, during the Top 3 stage, Marashi proposed to marry his girlfriend. The two married on 7 July 2010 in Hamburg. He eventually won against other finalist Menowin Fröhlich with 56.4% of the public vote.

DSDS performances

After DSDS

After his win in April 2010, he released "Don't Believe" written and produced by Dieter Bohlen. It topped the German, Austrian and Swiss charts. It was also a hit in the Netherlands. The follow-up was "Sweat" a cover of Inner Circle's "Sweat (A La La La La Long)" also featuring season 4 winner Mark Medlock. Both were from his debut album New Life that was released on 11 June 2010. A planned tour was cancelled due to low demand. In February 2011, Marashi opened a dance school and established a recording studio both in Hamburg.

On 24 June 2011, he released a second album Change Up with "Beautiful World" as a single, both with no success. He later released "Eine Nacht", his own composition. In 2012, he also founded his own label M8. In 2013, he was also involved in Promiboxen (celebrity boxing) with an initial fight against Daniel Aminati.

Discography

Albums

Singles

References

External links

 

1980 births
Living people
Deutschland sucht den Superstar winners
21st-century German male singers
German pop singers
Musicians from Hamburg
Iranian male singers
Iranian emigrants to Germany
Naturalized citizens of Germany